A chop shop is a business, often mimicking a body shop, that illicitly disassembles stolen motor vehicles and sells their parts. Chop shops are often linked to car-theft rings as part of a broader organized crime enterprise.

In the United States, the federal Motor Vehicle Theft Law Enforcement Act of 1984 and Federal Anti-Car Theft Act of 1992, as well as U.S. Department of Transportation regulations issued under those acts, require automobile manufacturers to label many different auto components (with some exemptions for new automobiles with selected anti-theft devices). A 1999 study commissioned by the U.S. Department of Justice's National Institute of Justice estimated that parts marking reduced the rate of professional car theft (with "between 33 and 158 fewer cars" being "stolen by professional thieves per 100,000 cars that were marked between 1987 and 1995"), inhibiting chop-shop operations.

See also
Carjacking
Motor vehicle theft
Pawn shop

References

External links

 Criminal Resource Manual 1369: Chop Shops (18 U.S.C. § 2322)
 Multi-State Chop Shop Operation Disrupted - Criminal Enterprise Leader Among Those Convicted (FBI)

Organized crime activity
Motor vehicle theft
Auto parts suppliers